Fred Hoaglin, (born January 28, 1944) is a former center in the National Football League (NFL) who played from 1966 to 1976.

Playing career 
Hoaglin graduated from East Palestine High School in East Palestine, Ohio and University of Pittsburgh, from where he was eventually drafted by the Cleveland Browns in the 1966 NFL Draft.

He was a member of the first Seattle Seahawks team after being acquired from the Houston Oilers in the 1976 NFL Expansion Draft.

NFL assistant coach 
After he retired as a player, Hoaglin served as an assistant coach for the Detroit Lions (1978–1984), New York Giants (1985–1992), New England Patriots (1993–1996), and Jacksonville Jaguars (1997–2000), serving under the Bill Parcells coaching tree during his stints at the last three franchises. 

He was an assistant coach for the Giants during their Super Bowl XXI and Super Bowl XXV championship seasons under Parcells, then won an AFC Championship at New England under Parcells in 1996 before the Patriots fell 35-21 to the Green Bay Packers in Super Bowl XXXI.

Parcells resigned from the Patriots to take the head coaching job with the New York Jets after that loss, but Hoaglin joined fellow Parcells coaching tree disciple Tom Coughlin in Jacksonville as the tight ends coach. During his time there, the Jacksonville Jaguars won two AFC Central Division titles, reached the playoffs in three consecutive seasons, and played in the 1999 AFC Championship Game.

Coaching History
 Detroit Lions (1978-1984) (OL)
 New York Giants (1985-1992) (OL)
 New England Patriots (1993-1996) (OL)
 Jacksonville Jaguars (1997-2001) (TE)

1944 births
Living people
American football offensive linemen
Pittsburgh Panthers football players
Cleveland Browns players
Baltimore Colts players
Houston Oilers players
Seattle Seahawks players
Eastern Conference Pro Bowl players
Detroit Lions coaches
New York Giants coaches
New England Patriots coaches
Jacksonville Jaguars coaches
People from Alliance, Ohio